Gonzalo Arconada Echarri (born 23 July 1961) is a Spanish football manager.

Coaching career
Arconada was born in San Sebastián, Gipuzkoa, and started coaching while still in his teens, with youth sides Juveniles de La Salle and Danak. His first twenty years would be spent with teams in his native region, mostly in the lower levels. After being in charge of the reserve team for several seasons, he coached Real Sociedad's main squad for a couple of months in 2006, being one of three managers during the campaign in La Liga.

After managing lowly Burgos CF and attaining promotion to the top division in 2008 with CD Numancia, Arconada signed with UD Almería. After a preseason without defeats, he was sacked in late December 2008 following a 1–0 loss at El Molinón, Sporting de Gijón's grounds, being replaced by Hugo Sánchez.

In the summer of 2009, Arconada returned to Numancia again in the second level, leaving his post at the end of the season after leading the Soria side to the eighth position. In August he moved to CD Tenerife, recently relegated from the top flight, being dismissed the following month after four losses in as many games.

On 21 November 2017, Arconada took the helm of the women's team of Real Sociedad. On 11 May 2019 he led them to their first ever title by winning the Copa de la Reina de Fútbol, after beating Atlético Madrid 2–1; on 30 June 2020, he left after his contract expired.

Personal life
Arconada's older brother, Luis, played 15 years with Real Sociedad, being widely regarded as one of the best goalkeepers in the nation's history.

Honours
Numancia
Segunda División: 2007–08

Real Sociedad (women)
Copa de la Reina: 2018–19

References

External links

1961 births
Living people
Sportspeople from San Sebastián
Spanish football managers
La Liga managers
Segunda División managers
Segunda División B managers
Real Unión managers
Tolosa CF managers
Real Sociedad B managers
Real Sociedad managers
Burgos CF managers
CD Numancia managers
UD Almería managers
CD Tenerife managers
CD Mirandés managers
Real Jaén managers
Barakaldo CF managers
Real Sociedad non-playing staff
Primera División (women) managers